Daniel Sean Vidot (born 8 February 1990) is an Australian professional wrestler and former professional rugby league footballer. He is currently signed to WWE, where he performs on the NXT brand under the ring name Xyon Quinn.

During his time in rugby league, he previously played as a er in the NRL for the Canberra Raiders, St. George Illawarra Dragons, Brisbane Broncos and the Gold Coast Titans. He also played for the Salford Red Devils in the Super League, and represented Samoa at an international level.

Early life
Born in Brisbane, Queensland, Vidot is of Samoan and Irish descent.

Vidot played his junior football at Souths Acacia Ridge, and attended Sunnybank State High School and St Thomas More College, Sunnybank before being signed the Canberra Raiders. In 2007, Vidot played the Queensland Under 17's team. Vidot played for the Canberra Raiders NYC team in 2008–2009 including playing in the Raiders team at  that won the 2008 inaugural Toyota Cup Grand Final against the Brisbane Broncos NYC team 28–24.

Rugby league career

2009
In Round 18 against the Penrith Panthers, Vidot scored his first NRL career try in the Raiders 27–14 loss at Penrith Stadium. In Round 25 against the Newcastle Knights at Canberra Stadium, Vidot was sin binned during the match after being in a fight with the Knight's Ben Rogers, the Raiders won the game 30–14 and Vidot scored a try. Vidot finished his debut year in the NRL with him playing in 8 matches and scoring 6 tries for the Raiders in the 2009 NRL season.

2010
Vidot finished the 2010 NRL season as the Raiders highest try scorer with 16 tries in 25 matches. Vidot was selected in the Samoan train on squad in 2010 to play New Zealand but withdrew so he would remain eligible to play for Queensland.

2011
On 30 August 2011, Vidot signed with the St George Illawarra Dragons starting in the 2012 season on a 3-year deal after falling out of favour with the Raiders spending most of the year in the Queensland Cup playing for the Souths Logan Magpies. Vidot finished the 2011 NRL season with him playing in 12 matches and scoring 5 tries for the Raiders.

2012
In Round 3 of the 2012 NRL season, Vidot made his club debut for the St George Illawarra Dragons against the Wests Tigers on the wing, scoring a try in the Dragons 36–12 win at Jubilee Oval. Vidot finished the year with him playing in 20 matches and scoring 5 tries for the Dragons.

2013
On 20 April 2013, Vidot played in the Pacific Rugby League International against Tonga, scoring the Samoan's only try in the 36–4 defeat at Penrith Stadium.
Vidot played in 15 matches scored 9 tries for the Dragons in the 2013 NRL season. On 15 October, Daniel Vidot signed a 2-year deal with the Brisbane Broncos. Vidot appeared in all four of Samoa's World Cup games and scored one try against France in their 22–6 win at Stade Gilbert Brutus.

2014
In Round 1 of the season, Vidot made his club debut for the Brisbane Broncos against the Canterbury-Bankstown Bulldogs on the wing, scoring a try in the Broncos 18–12 win at ANZ Stadium. On 3 May 2014, Vidot was selected to play for Samoa in the 2014 Pacific Rugby League International against Fiji on the wing and scored a try in the 32–16 win at Penrith Stadium. On 18 July 2014, Vidot was demoted to the Queensland Cup along with Jack Reed and Corey Oates after they breached the club mid-week anti-alcohol policies, missing the Broncos match against the New Zealand Warriors at Suncorp Stadium. Vidot late returned for the Broncos in Round 21 against the Manly-Warringah Sea Eagles in the Broncos 16–4 loss at Brookvale Oval. In Round 24 against the Newcastle Knights, Vidot played his 100th NRL career match, scoring a try in the Broncos 48–6 win at Suncorp Stadium. Vidot finished off his first season with the Broncos with him playing in 23 matches and scoring 8 tries.

Vidot played in all of Samoa's 3 matches in the 2014 Four Nations series, scoring 1 try.

2015
Vidot started the 2015 NRL season in the Queensland Cup playing for the Ipswich Jets at  when coach Wayne Bennett axed him due to his error riddled World Cup Series match against Wigan. On 25 March 2015, Vidot was granted compassionate leave from his Broncos contract after a deal with the South Sydney Rabbitohs fell through. Vidot later earned his recall to Broncos NRL team in Round 5 against the Gold Coast Titans in the Broncos 26–16 win at Robina Stadium. On 2 May 2015, Vidot played for Samoa against Tonga in the 2015 Polynesian Cup, playing on the wing and scored a try in Samoa's 18–16 win at Cbus Super Stadium. Vidot finished the 2015 NRL season with him playing in 8 matches and scoring 4 tries for the Broncos.

2016
On 11 November 2015, it was announced that Vidot had signed a 2-year contract with English Super League club, the Salford Red Devils, starting in 2016. Injuries prevented Vidot from making an immediate impact with the Red Devils, and he subsequently made his debut for Salford on 7 May in the Challenge Cup on the wing. However, he failed to score a try in the 32–18 loss. Vidot scored his first two tries for the Red Devils in an 18–12 victory over the Widnes Vikings in Round 15 of the regular season.

In addition to his move to the Super League, Vidot took part in a trial for WWE, as he got the attention of wrestling talent scouts from the US because of his size, acting background, and perceived status as an elite athlete. He revealed in an interview that he initially received an offer for a trial from the company in 2015, but turned it down due to good form with the Broncos. He also stated he was a wrestling fan growing up, and would often imitate The Undertaker.

Vidot ended his debut year in the Super League playing in 10 matches, and scoring 6 tries for Salford. At the end of the season, Vidot was released from his contract with Salford on compassionate grounds, citing a desire to return to Australia.

2017
It was announced in late 2016 that the Gold Coast Titans were interested in bringing Vidot back to the NRL. Vidot signed a one-year deal with the Titans, and was named in their Auckland Nines squad. Vidot played out the Titans 30–18 victory over the Parramatta Eels in the Alice Springs pre-season trial match, and made his club debut in Round 4, scoring a try in the 32–26 defeat against the North Queensland Cowboys. As the Titans favoured using Dale Copley and Anthony Don on the wings, Vidot was mainly relegated to the Burleigh Bears, the Titans' affiliate club in the Queensland Cup competition. Vidot appeared for the Titans in three games in 2017, scoring two tries, before retiring from rugby league at the end of the season to pursue a professional wrestling career with WWE.

Professional wrestling career 
In May 2018, Vidot signed a developmental contract with WWE.

On 24 April 2020, Vidot made his on screen debut on that night's episode of SmackDown losing to Sheamus. On 20 October, Vidot's ring name Xyon Quinn was trademarked by WWE. On 16 July 2021, Quinn would team with Odyssey Jones in a losing effort to Austin Theory and Harry Smith in a dark match which took place prior to SmackDown, the first episode in front of fans since March 2020. He debuted on NXT on 24 August in an upset victory over Boa. On 3 September, Quinn defeated Andre Chase in his 205 Live debut and would return to the brand on 24 September with a victory over Oney Lorcan, and defeated Lorcan for a second time on NXT four days later.

Quinn had a brief feud with Robert Stone after putting him through a table at NXT: Halloween Havoc, leading to him being challenged the next week where he sung and danced to Shawn Michaels' theme, and beat Stone in a quick match. On 9 November episode of NXT, he garnered the attention of Elektra Lopez and Legado Del Fantasma, who wanted him to join the group but refused her offer, leading to returning leader Santos Escobar taking him out on the following week's episode. This led to a match on 7 December episode of NXT, where Quinn lost to Escobar after Lopez distracted him with a pair of brass knuckles. Quinn began interrupting Legado Del Fantasma's matches in the following weeks, leading to another encounter with Escobar on 12 January 2022 episode of NXT, where Lopez interfered and cost Quinn the match. On 25 February episode of NXT Level Up, Quinn lost against James Drake.

Quinn started getting involved with Draco Anthony and his feud with Joe Gacy and Harland, when Anthony snapped at him for trying to cheer him up, leading to a match on 12 April episode of NXT where Quinn defeated him. The following week, Quinn confronted Wes Lee for making fun of his "run it straight" philosophy, leading to a match later in the evening, where Quinn won. Quinn was scheduled to face Tony D'Angelo on 26 April episode of NXT, but was not medically cleared to compete and was pulled from the match. On 10 May episode of NXT, Quinn turned heel after confronting Nathan Frazer to "run it straight" and he and Lee mocked Quinn over the phrase. Two weeks later, he taunted Lee after his match with Sanga, but backed down when the latter pulled him away. On 31 May episode of NXT, Quinn fought Lee in another match but lost.

On 20 September, Quinn confronted Quincy Elliott celebrating his debut win from last week, giving him advice on how to be a superstar by imitating him to develop his X-factor. After defeating Hank Walker on 4 October episode of NXT, he attempted to take out Walker but was stopped by Elliott and left the ring. Two weeks later, Quinn attempted to coerce SmackDown wrestler Shotzi into being her co-host for Halloween Havoc, but was interrupted by Elliott who wanted the same job as him. This led to a match where Quinn lost against Eliott after his attempt to cheat was thwarted by Walker. Quinn made his main roster debut on 10 November episode of Main Event with a win over Akira Tozawa.

References

External links

1990 births
Living people
21st-century professional wrestlers
Australian male professional wrestlers
Australian people of Irish descent
Australian rugby league players
Australian sportspeople of Samoan descent
Brisbane Broncos players
Canberra Raiders players
Gold Coast Titans players
Illawarra Cutters players
Ipswich Jets players
Rugby league players from Brisbane
Rugby league wingers
Samoa national rugby league team players
Samoan rugby league players
Souths Logan Magpies players
St. George Illawarra Dragons players